Noite na Taverna (in ) is a short story collection written by Brazilian Ultra-Romantic author Álvares de Azevedo under the pen name Job Stern. It was published posthumously, in 1855; three years after Azevedo's death. The book is structured as a frame story containing five tales (as well as a prologue and an epilogue, thus totaling seven chapters) told by a group of five men sheltering in a tavern. It is one of the most popular and influential works of Gothic fiction in Brazilian literature.

It is said that the book was largely inspired by Spanish author José Cadalso's 1790 work Noches lúgubres.

Plot

Chapter 1: "Uma Noite do Século"
The first chapter of the book, "Uma Noite do Século" ("A Night of the Century"), introduces its setting – a tavern in an undisclosed location filled with prostitutes, drunkards and libertines. At a nearby table, influenced by the alcohol, a group of five friends – Solfieri, Bertram, Gennaro, Claudius Hermann and Johann – decide to share with each other certain events of their lives. The five tales have, in common, aspects such as unsuccessful love stories, cannibalism, murders, sexual violence, heavy drinking, among others.

Chapter 2: "Solfieri"
When in Rome, on a rainy night, Solfieri sees a shadow crying over a window. He realizes it is a beautiful woman. She leaves the house and Solfieri decides to follow her, and they ultimately arrive at a nearby cemetery. There, the woman cries, kneeling before a headstone, as Solfieri falls asleep watching her from afar.

One year later, Solfieri, wandering the streets of Rome after taking part in an orgy, ends into a church inadvertently. He sees a coffin and, after listening to breathing noises inside, opens it, and sees the cemetery lady he met the year before inside it. After realizing that she is still alive (but in a cataleptic state), he carries her through the city. Arriving at his home, the woman dies two days later, of a very high fever. Solfieri buries her under the floorboards of his bedroom and pays a sculptor for a statuette built in the woman's likeness.

Chapter 3: "Bertram"
Bertram tells the story of his ill-fated love for a Spanish woman from Cádiz, named Angela. Amidst their romance, Bertram's sick father, living in Denmark, calls for him. He goes, returning two years later; however, during the time he was away, Angela marries another man, having a son with him. Despite this, Bertram tries to maintain his affair with her, but Angela's husband finds out everything. Before her husband kills her, she kills him and her child, and flees with Bertram.

One day, without further explanations, she leaves him. Bertram sinks into despair as he tries to forget Angela; subdued by woe, he faints in the middle of a street and is run over by a chariot. The passengers of the chariot, an old man and his 18-year-old daughter, help him and take him to their mansion so he can recover. Bertram gets in love with the lady and they flee together, but he ultimately gets bored with her and sells the lady to a pirate in a card game. Later, he would learn that the girl poisoned the pirate and threw herself in the sea.

Having moved to Italy, Bertram decides to kill himself there, but when he is about to do it, he is saved by a sailor whom he kills unintentionally. Bertram spends some time in the sailor's ship (a corvette), where he gets in love with the captain's wife, being requited.

In the midst of this affair, the ship is attacked by pirates and sinks, but not without making the other one sink too. The captain, his wife, Bertram and two other unnamed sailors are able to save themselves in a raft. Some time later, with no water or food, the two unnamed sailors being washed out by the sea, the three lot in order to discover who will be killed and serve as food for the others. The chosen one is the captain, but he does not accept his fate and fights for his life. He loses the fight however, and Bertram and the woman are obligated to eat him because of the lack of food, maintaining themselves for two days.

Arriving at a beach, both already weakened by hunger, the woman asks Bertram for a last moment of love before her death. Afraid of dying, Bertram strangles her and lives at the beach in complete solitude until he is found by a British brig that rescues him.

Chapter 4: "Gennaro"
The painter Gennaro reminisces of when he was the young apprentice of the famous Godofredo Walsh. Walsh had a young, beautiful wife named Nauza (whom Gennaro loved) and a young, beautiful daughter named Laura (who loved Gennaro). One day, Laura gets pregnant of Gennaro, but when she proposes marriage to him, he declines. Displeased, she gradually sinks into depression and dies, taking the baby with her.

The old painter, not knowing anything, visits his daughter's bedroom every night and, because of this, Gennaro starts sleeping with his wife. However, the painter is able to make Gennaro confess everything in a certain night. Days later, Godofredo takes Gennaro to a cliff and tries to kill him; however, he survives the fall and decides to return to Godofredo's house – initially planning to apologize, but later he changes his mind and decides to take his revenge on the painter and murder him. However, when he arrives at the painter's house, he finds both Nauza and Godofredo dead.

Chapter 5: "Claudius Hermann"
Claudius Hermann, an assiduous gambler, spots the beautiful Duchess Eleonora at a horse race and falls in love with her at first sight. He meets her once more in a theatre later on, and during an entire week he stalks her.

In a certain night, he bribes one of the duchess' lackeys for permission to enter her house for an hour, and also obtains a copy of her bedroom's keys. He puts sedative in the duchess' wine and has sex with her, returning for many nights.

One day, however, her husband, Duke Maffio, inadvertently drinks some of the sedative as well. Desperate and afraid of being caught, Claudius plans to kill him, but changes his mind and kidnaps Eleonora instead while she is still sleeping. Arriving in an inn, she wakes up, and Claudius tells her everything, forcing her to stay with him. Optionless, she accepts.

Some days later, Claudius has to leave in order to take care of some affairs; when he returns home, he finds the duchess and her husband dead.

Chapter 6: "Johann"
Johann's story begins in a different tavern, located in Paris. He was playing a game of carambole with a blond-haired man named Arthur. Johann was losing the game, while Arthur only needed to score one point to win. When it is Johann's turn to play, Arthur bumps into the table (accidentally or not), detouring Johann's ball, thus making him lose the game. Infuriated, he defies Arthur to a duel, which he accepts. They stop at a hotel to get the guns, and the blond man writes two letters. They head to a deserted and dark street. In there, they choose their guns – but only one is loaded.

They shoot. It is revealed that Johann's gun was the loaded one, and Arthur, before supposedly dying, hands Johann the letters he wrote. The first letter is addressed to Arthur's mother, and the other one is addressed to his girlfriend; he also hands Johann her address and an engagement ring. Pretending to be Arthur, Johann then decides to steal his girlfriend.

In the morning after they sleep together, Johann is attacked by a mysterious man. After a short struggle, he kills the man. However, after a close inspection, he discovers that the man he killed was his own brother, and Arthur's girlfriend was his sister.

Chapter 7: "Último Beijo de Amor"
In the last chapter, "Último Beijo de Amor" ("Last Love Kiss"), the orgy ends; everyone is sleeping. A mysterious hooded figure walks into the tavern and kills Johann, and then heads toward a man named Arnold.

The figure is revealed to be Giorgia, Johann's sister, and Arnold is actually Arthur (who was saved by a passerby after the duel) under a false name. Giorgia reveals to Arthur that she wanted to get her revenge on Johann, and having done so, the honor Johann stole from her when they slept together is finally restored.

After exchanging some love words with Arthur, both decide to commit suicide.

Adaptations
An independent short film based on the book received a limited release around some Brazilian film festivals and arthouse cinemas on March 6, 2014. Directed and written by Yghor Boy, it stars Renato Basilla as Solfieri, Renan Bleastè as Bertram, Hélcio Henriques as Gennaro, Raul Figueiredo as Claudius Hermann, Sérgio Siveiro as Johann, Ricardo Merini as Arnold/Arthur and Mayara Constantino as Giorgia. Intertwined between each tale are glimpses of the academic life of Álvares de Azevedo himself, who is portrayed by Victor Mendes.

The film won the Prêmio ABC de Cinematografia for Best Direction of Photography in a Student Film in May 2015.

References

External links
 Official Facebook page for the film adaptation 
 
 

1855 short story collections
Works published under a pseudonym
Romanticism
Brazilian short story collections
Books published posthumously
Gothic short stories